is a prefectural museum in Yamagata, Japan, dedicated to the natural history and history of Yamagata Prefecture.

See also
 List of Historic Sites of Japan (Yamagata)
 Dewa Province

References

External links
 Yamagata Prefectural Museum
 List of Museums in Yamagata Prefecture

Museums in Yamagata Prefecture
Yamagata, Yamagata
History museums in Japan
Prefectural museums
Museums established in 1971
1971 establishments in Japan